Hassan is one of the 30 districts of Karnataka, India. The district headquarter is Hassan. It was carved out from Mysore district in the year 1866, during the Commissioner's Rule of Mysore (1831-81).

Hassan District contains 8 taluks with their respective headquarters in Hassan, Arsikere, Channarayapatna, Belur, Holenarasipura, Sakleshpur, Alur and Arkalgud.

Governance 
Current Member of Parliament from Hassan is Prajwal Revanna who is also one of the youngest Lok Sabha members and is grandson of former Prime Minister of India H. D. Deve Gowda.
The Current Member of the Karnataka Legislative Assembly is Preetham J. Gowda.

History
Hassan district was the seat of the Hoysala Empire which at its peak ruled large parts of south India from Belur as its early capital and Halebidu as its later capital during the period 1000–1334 CE.

The district is named Hassan after the Hindu Goddess "Haasanamba", the goddess and presiding deity of the town. The history of Hassan district is essentially the history of two of the well known dynasties that have ruled Karnataka, the Western Ganga Dynasty of Talkad (350–999 CE) and the Hoysala Empire (1000–1334 CE). In the 15th and 16th centuries, the Vijayanagar kings patronised Chennakesava of Belur as their family deity. It was also ruled by Adilshahis of Bijapur and Mughal Empire after decline of the Vijayanagar. In the 17th and 18th centuries, Hassan became a land of contention between the Keladi Nayakas of Shimoga and the Mysore Kingdom. It finally merged as an independent Mysore kingdom.

Modern
During the 14th century, invasions by the Sultanate of Delhi weakened the Hoysala state, and the district became part of the Vijayanagara Empire. In the 15th and 16th centuries, the Vijayanagar kings patronised Chennakesava of Belur as their family deity. It was also ruled by Adilshahis of Bijapur and Mughal Empire after decline of the Vijayanagar. In the 17th and 18th centuries, Hassan became a land of contention between the Keladi Nayakas of Shimoga and the Mysore Kingdom. In 1648 the Mysore rulers built Channarayapatna fort by treaty with the sultans of Bijapur. A peace treaty was concluded between the Mysore and Keladi rulers in 1694.  The district remained part of the Mysore Kingdom at the conclusion of the Fourth Anglo-Mysore War in 1799.

Hassan District and its current boundaries date to the 1860s, when the Mysore Kingdom was organized into 8 districts, and the districts further divided into taluks. The district had a population of 518,987 in the 1871 census. A famine from 1876 to 1878 reduced the population to 428,344 by 1881. The population was 511,975 in 1891, and 568,919 in 1901. The 1901 census recorded 541,531 Hindus, 16,668 Muslims, 5035 Animists, 3795 Christians, 1874 Jains, and 16 others. The district had 14 towns, and 2546 villages.

Reserve forests were established in the 19th century, and covered an area of 185 square miles in the district. The forests, with their area in square miles, were: Kempuhole Ghat (16), Kaganeri Ghati (2), Kabbinale Ghat (23), Bisale Ghat (23), Vijayapur (5), Hirikalgudda (92), Doddabetta (3), Burdalbore (3), Hagare (3), Byaba (2), Sige-gudda (8), Baisur (1), Mallappan-betta (1), and Vantigudda (1). The state established five sandalwood forests, totaling three square miles: Kemmanbore (232 acres), Gubbi (428 acres), Gadagere (554 acres), Gubbi (1000 acres), and Nakalgud (185 acres).

After India's independence in 1947, Mysore Kingdom became Mysore State, which was renamed Karnataka state in 1973.

List of famous temples in Hassan
 Chennakesava Temple, Belur
 Hoysaleswara Temple, Halebidu
 Gommateshwara Statue, Shravanabelagola
 Hasanamba Temple, Hassan
 Nageshvara-Chennakeshava Temple, Mosale
 Ishvara Temple, Arsikere

Geography

Lying between 12° 13´ and 13° 33´ North latitudes and 75° 33´ and 76°38´ East longitude, Hassan district has a total area of 6826.15 km2.
The geography is mixed with the malnad or mountainous region to the west and south west called Bisle Ghat and the maidan or plains regions in the north, south and east. There are some areas of degraded forest ranges in central portion of the district.

The district is surrounded by Chikmagalur District to the north, Tumkur District to the east, Mandya District to the south east, Mysore to the south, Kodagu District to the south west and Dakshina Kannada district to the west.

Most of the district lies in the watershed of the Hemavathi River, a tributary of the Kaveri River. The general level of Hassan district slopes with the course of the Hemavati, from the peaks of the Western Ghats downwards to the southeast. The chief tributary of the Hemavathi is the Yagachi River, which flows southward from Belur taluk to join the Hemavathi near Gorur. In 1981 the Hemavathi Dam was completed near Gorur, downstream from the confluence with the Yagachi, creating a reservoir of 8000 hectares. The Hemavathi passes through Holenarsipur taluk in a southerly direction and joins with the Kaveri near Hampapura in Mysore district, close to the border of Hassan district. The Kaveri flows through the southernmost part of the District.

Western portions of the district are drained by the headwaters of the Netravati River, which flows northwestward to empty into the Arabian Sea. Portions of Arsikere taluk in the northeast are drained by the Hagari River, a tributary of the Tungabhadra River. The basins of the Kaveri and Tungabhadra are separated by a range of low granitic hills extending through Belur, Hassan, and Arsikere taluks.

The Bisle Ghat, or Bisale Ghat, is a portion of the Western Ghats range in the western part of the district. Main peaks include Jenkalbetta, the highest peak in the district, Murkangudda, and Devarbetta. Pushpagiri (1,712 meters), lies immediately southwest in Kodagu and district. Bisle, Kagneri, Kanchankumari reserve forests cover portions the Bisle Ghat, and adjoin Pushpagiri Wildlife Sanctuary in Kodagu.

Administrative divisions
Hassan District is administratively divided into eight talukas (Panchayat blocks): Alur, Arkalgud, Arsikere, Belur, Channarayapatna, Hassan, Holenarasipura (H.N. Pura) and Sakleshpur, and 258 panchayat villages.

Demographics

According to the 2011 census Hassan district has a population of 1,776,421, roughly equal to the nation of The Gambia or the US state of Nebraska. This gives it a ranking of 270th in India (out of a total of 640). Its population growth rate over the decade 2001-2011 was  3.17%. Hassan has a sex ratio of 1005 females for every 1000 males, and a literacy rate of 75.89%. Scheduled Castes and Scheduled Tribes make up 19.42% and 1.82% of the population respectively.

At the time of the 2011 census, 87.04% of the population spoke Kannada, 6.16% Urdu, 1.96% Telugu and 1.22% Tulu as their first language.

Transport

Air
There is no operational airport in the city. The nearest airport is Mysore airport and the nearest international airport is Kempegowda International Airport. Hassan Airport is an airport under construction 10 kilometer east of the city, near the Boovanahalli village. The project was first rejected by the State government in 2012. It was again revived in 2021 with a budget of Rs 175 crore and will be taken up by the UDAN scheme. Government of India has granted the approval for setting up of 15 Greenfield airports in the country on May 12, 2015. Among 15 Airports Hassan Also approved for Greenfield Airport.

Road
The Karnataka State Road Transport Corporation operates connecting Hassan with other parts of Karnataka as well as other states. Major National Highways that pass through the district are NH-75 Bengaluru - Mangaluru, NH-73(& its subsidiary NH-373) Mangaluru - Villipuram and NH-69 
Honnavara - Chittor.

Rail
Hassan comes under the South Western Railway zone of the Indian Railways. Hassan Junction railway station connects it to the rest of the country through the Indian Railways

Education 
 Government Engineering College, Hassan
 Rajeev Institute of Technology
 Jawahar Navodaya Vidyalaya,  Hassan
 Kendriya Vidyalaya 
 Malnad College of Engineering
 St. Joseph's College, Hassan
 Podar International School, Hassan
 HKS International School & PU College
 United Academy
 Times Gurukula

Notable people
 H. D. Deve Gowda, 11th Prime Minister of India
 Gorur Ramaswamy Iyengar, Renowned Kannada writer
 S. L. Bhyrappa, writer
Raja Rao, Indian-American writer 
 H. C. Srikantaiah, Former Minister and Member of Parliament
 Javagal Srinath, cricketer
T. N. Balakrishna, Indian actor 
 Dheerendra Gopal, film actor
 Doddanna, film actor
 Shruti, film actress
 Sharan, film actor 
 Chitra Shenoy, Indian actress 
Nikhil Kumar, Indian actor and politician 
 Prajwal Revanna, Indian politician
 David Johnson, Ranji player
 Dhananjay, film actor
 M. G. Srinivas, actor and director 
 G. R. Gopinath, founder of Air Deccan
 H. D. Revanna, politician
 H. D. Kumaraswamy, Former Chief Minister, Karnataka
H. S. Prakash, Indian politician 
 Preetham J. Gowda, Karnataka MLA
 Narayana Gowda, Karnataka Rakshana Vedike state president
 Chandan Shetty, Kannada rapper
 Nanditha, Indian singer 
 Veera Ballala II, Hoysala king
 Veera Ballala III, Hoysala king
 Vishnuvardhana, Hoysala king
 Chavundaraya, Indian military commander and architect 
 Singarasa, Chieftain 
Harihara, Kannada poet and writer 
 Yash, Kannada film actor
 Prashanth Neel, Kannada film director
 Milana Nagaraj, Kannada film actress
 Vasishta N. Simha, film actor
 Prathap Simha, politician
 C. N. Manjunath, Cardiologist and the Director of the Sri Jayadeva Institute of Cardiovascular Sciences and Research
 Achyuth Kumar, Indian film actor
 A. S. Kiran Kumar, Indian space scientist and former chairman of the ISRO
Chetan Baboor, Indian table tennis player
Suhas Lalinakere Yathiraj,IAS and Para-Badminton player
Shashank Subramanyam, Indian musician
 J. Anoop Seelin, Indian music composer and playback singer 
Arathi, Indian actress
K. S. Ashwath, Indian actor
Chi. Udaya Shankar, Kannada Lyricist 
Gudibande Poornima, poet & novelist
S. K. Ramachandra Rao, Indian author 
R. Shamasastry, Sanskrit scholar
 Satchidanandendra Saraswati, monk-scholar
 K. Pattabhi Jois, Indian yoga guru
 Rudrapatnam Brothers, Indian carnatic musicians
 R. K. Padmanabha, Indian Carnatic music  vocalist 
 R. K. Srikantan, vocalist 
Rathnamala Prakash, Indian singer 
Prithviraj, Kannada actor
Vijaya Dabbe, Indian writer, feminist, scholar
Girisha Nagarajegowda, Paralympic athlete
H. K. Narayana, Singer and music composer
 Nisha Ravikrishnan, Television actress

See also
 Haanagal
 Manjarabad Fort, a star fort from 1792
 Shravanabelagola
 Sakleshpur
 Mangalore
 Belur
 Halebidu

Notes

References
 Kamath, Suryanath U. (2001). A Concise History of Karnataka from pre-historic times to the present, Jupiter books, MCC, Bangalore (reprinted 2002),

External links

 Official website
 

 
Districts of Karnataka